Victor Ronald Hooks (born 4 July 1955) is a former professional footballer who played as a forward.

References

1955 births
Living people
Association footballers from Belfast
English footballers
Association football forwards
Manchester United F.C. players
Grimsby Town F.C. players
English Football League players
Glentoran F.C. players
Cliftonville F.C. players
Crusaders F.C. players
Dundela F.C. players
Newry City F.C. players